John Chrysoloras was a relative of Manuel Chrysoloras, (variously described as his nephew, brother or son) who like him had studied and taught at Constantinople and then migrated to Italy. There he was influential in spreading Greek letters in the West. He was a patron and teacher of fellow Renaissance humanist Francesco Filelfo whom his daughter married.

See also
Greek scholars in the Renaissance

References

15th-century Byzantine people
Greek Renaissance humanists
15th-century Greek educators
14th-century Greek educators